John Mather (1848 – 18 February 1916) was a Scottish-Australian plein-air painter and etcher.

Early life
Mather was born in Hamilton, South Lanarkshire, Scotland, son of John Mather, a surveyor, and his wife Margaret, née Allan. Mather worked as a house decorator.
Mather studied art at the Royal Glasgow Institute of the Fine Arts and migrated to Australia in 1878. He was married in 1882 to Miss Jessie Pines Best, a daughter of Captain James Best, a pilot of Hobson's Bay. Together they had one daughter and three sons,  Margaret Playfair, John Allan, Louis Melville (died in infancy), and Leslie Frank Strand (died in 1919).

Career
In 1880, Mather was partly responsible for the decoration of the dome of the Royal Exhibition Building, Melbourne. He was appointed to the board of trustees of the Public Library, Museums and National Gallery of Victoria in 1892. and was a founding member of the Victorian Artists' Society, president in 1893–1900, 1906–1908 and 1911. Mather was a member of the Felton Bequest Committee from 1905–1916 and as trustee, strongly supported Australian art.

As a painter, Mather was also involved in the bohemian Artists' Camps of Sydney. In 1912 along with Frederick McCubbin, Max Meldrum, Walter Withers Mather formed the breakaway Australian Art Association.

Three of Mather's own paintings, Autumn in the Fitzroy Gardens in oils, and Morning, Lake Omeo and Wintry Weather, Yarra Glen, both watercolours, were purchased by the National Gallery of Victoria.

Death
Mather died of diabetes at his home, Cadzow, South Yarra, Victoria on 18 February 1916; he was buried in the Cheltenham Pioneer Cemeteryand now lies in a grave with no memorial.

Written just thirteen years after his death, "The war claimed his only son and his daughter who was well known in Melbourne music circles, lives now in the United States. It is as if "the place thereof knoweth him no more " But how can an artist ever be forgotten as long as human eyes are irresistibly drawn to the quiet beauty of his pictures on the wall?"

References

External links
Catalogue of Exhibition of Australian Landscapes by John Mather
John Mather on artnet
Friends of Cheltenham and Regional Cemeteries Inc.

Scottish emigrants to colonial Australia
1848 births
1916 deaths
19th-century Australian painters
19th-century Australian male artists
20th-century Australian painters
20th-century Australian male artists
Australian male painters
People from Hamilton, South Lanarkshire
19th-century Scottish male artists
19th-century Scottish painters
Artists from Melbourne